The Clarkson Golden Knights women's ice hockey program represented Clarkson University during the
2009–10 NCAA women's ice hockey season. The Golden Knights secured their sixth consecutive appearance in the ECAC playoffs, and qualified for their first NCAA tournament.

Class of 2010
Britney Selina, Carlee Eusepi, Genevieve Lavoie, Ashleigh Moorehead, Tegan Schroeder, and Dominique Thibault were the senior class of 2010. During their four years with Clarkson, the club accumulated 81 victories. This was highlighted by two 20+ win campaigns (2007–08 and 2009–10). In addition, there were four appearances in the ECAC Hockey playoffs and two championship tournament showings in 2008 and 2010. The final year was highlighted by the Golden Knights first ever appearance in the NCAA Tournament this season.

Schedule

|-
!colspan=12 style=""| Regular Season

|-
!colspan=12 style=""| ECAC Hockey Tournament

|-
!colspan=12 style=""| NCAA Tournament

Roster

Player stats

Skaters

Awards and honors

 Juana Baribeau – ECAC Hockey Player of the Week (10/12)
 Lauren Dahm – 2009–10 ECAC Hockey Second Team All-Star, ECAC Hockey Goaltender of the Week (10/5, 10/12, 10/26), ECAC Hockey weekly Honor Roll (11/2, 11/9, 12/7), Patty Kazmaier Memorial Award nominee
 Carlee Eusepi – 2009–10 ECAC Hockey Best Defensive Defenseman, 2009–10 ECAC Hockey Second Team All-Star, All-Star ECAC Hockey representative vs Team USA, ECAC Hockey Player of the Week (11/9, 3/1)
 Kali Gillanders – ECAC Hockey Player of the Week (11/2)
 Katelyn Ptolemy – ECAC Hockey Student-Athlete of the Year nominee
 Britney Selina – 2009–10 ECAC Hockey Best Defensive Forward, 2009–10 ECAC Hockey Second Team All-Star, All-Star ECAC Hockey representative vs Team USA, ECAC Hockey Player of the Week (10/26), Patty Kazmaier Memorial Award nominee
 Dominque Thibault – 2009–10 ECAC Hockey Third Team All-Star, All-Star ECAC Hockey representative vs Team USA, ECAC Hockey Player of the Week (1/25), ECAC Hockey weekly Honor Roll (12/7), Patty Kazmaier Memorial Award nominee
 Melissa Waldie – ECAC Hockey Player of the Week (10/5, 10/19)
 Hailey Wood – ECAC Hockey weekly Honor Roll (10/5, 10/12)

See also
2009–10 ECAC Hockey women's ice hockey season

References

External links
Official site

Clarkson Golden Knights women's ice hockey seasons
Clarkson